Meg Otanwa  (born 14 February) is a Nigerian actress and former banker. She had her Nollywood debut in 2011 in the film, I'll Take My Chances and had featured in films such as October 1 (2018), Ojuju (2014), Kpians: The Feast of Souls (2014) and many others. She was the November 2006 cover star of Zen magazine.

Life and education
Otanwa hails from the Idoma speaking area of Benue State, Nigeria, growing up partly in Lagos. She comes from a polyglot family and speaks about five languages including English, Yoruba, French, Hausa, her mother tongue Idoma and some Spanish. She is a graduate of Ahmadu Bello University, Zaria where she obtained a bachelor’s degree in English language, then proceeded to obtain a master’s degree in Human Resources Management at TIME University, Tunis, Tunisia and afterwards, for a Master of Business Administration degree at Jean Moulin University, Lyon, France.

Career
Having worked for a long period at the African Development Bank, Tunis, Tunisia, Otanwa resigned and picked up a career in acting, making her Nollywood debut in 2011, featuring in the dance drama film by Emem Isong, Ill Take My Chance. In 2014, she was starred in Kunle Afolayan's film, October 1; in Bodunrin Sasore's drama series, Before 30, starring as "Aisha"; and in Charles Novia's film, Atlanta.

She was starred in the 2016 Africa Magic's debut telenovela, Nollywood's Hush, as "Koko Ogunbiade". Also featured are Richard Mofe Damijo, Thelma Okoduwa and Rotimi Adelegan.

She got nominated at the 2017 Africa Magic Viewers Choice Awards for the Best Actress in a Drama category and the AMVCA recognition award for MNET original series, which she won, for her role in the thriller telenovela, Hush. The actress was also present at the red carpet of the 2018 event.

In the 2018 Tosin Igho film titled, The Eve, she was starred as "Alero", acting alongside actors and actresses like Beverly Naya, Hauwa Allhabura, John Okafor and others.

In the 2020 film, For Maria Ebun Pataki, directed by Damilola Orimogunje, she was starred as "Derin".

She was featured as "Angela" in Dimeji Ajibola's sci-fi thriller, Ratnik, which was released on 1 December 2020 also featuring Osas Ighodaro, Tope Tedela, Karibi Fubara, Paul Utomi and others.

Filmatography

Accolades

See also
 List of Nigerian actors

References

External links
 Meg Otanwa on IMDb
 Meg Otanwa on Bella Naija Style
 Meg Otanwa on Lonny
 Meg Otanwa on Africa Magic
 Meg Otanwa: Five Facts About The Rising Star on HeavyNG

Living people
People from Benue State
Ahmadu Bello University alumni
Nigerian bankers
21st-century Nigerian actresses
Year of birth missing (living people)
Nigerian film actresses
Actresses from Benue State
Actresses in Yoruba cinema